The High River Flyers are a junior "B" ice hockey team based in High River, Alberta, Canada. They are members of the South Division of the Heritage Junior B Hockey League (HJHL). They play their home games at Bob Snodgrass Recreation Complex.

Season-by-season record  

Note: GP = Games played, W = Wins, L = Losses, T = Ties, OTL = Overtime Losses, Pts = Points, GF = Goals for, GA = Goals against, PIM = Penalties in minutes

See also  
List of ice hockey teams in Alberta

External links  
Official website of the High River Flyers

Ice hockey teams in Alberta
High River